Charles C. Malone (June 18, 1910 – May 23, 1992) was an American football end in the National Football League (NFL).

Malone was born in Hillsboro, Texas, and graduated from Dallas's Terrill School in 1929.

Charley (or Charlie Malone) played football for four years at Texas A&M, 1929–1932, and served in the U.S. Marine Corps. He played professional football for the Boston/Washington Redskins for 8 years (1934–42) as well as the pre-NFL, St. Louis Gunners.

In an era in which each NFL team's roster was capped at 33 players, Malone played offensive and defensive end for the Redskins. As a wide receiver, Malone caught most of his passes from fellow Texan Sammy Baugh. Malone led the NFL in receiving in 1935 and finished 5 NFL seasons among the top 10 in receptions. He was selected to play in the NFL Pro Bowl in 1942. His teams twice won the NFL championship (1937 and 1942).

References

External links

1910 births
1992 deaths
Players of American football from Texas
American football wide receivers
Texas A&M Aggies football players
Boston Redskins players
Washington Redskins players
St. Louis Gunners players
People from Hillsboro, Texas